In Greek mythology, Opheltius (Ancient Greek: Ὀφέλέστης), is the name of two soldiers in the Trojan War on each side of the conflict:
Opheltius, a defender of Troy killed by Euryalus.
Opheltius, an Achaean killed by Hector.

Notes

References
 Homer, The Iliad with an English Translation by A.T. Murray, Ph.D. in two volumes. Cambridge, Massachusetts, Harvard University Press; London, William Heinemann, Ltd. 1924. Online version at the Perseus Digital Library.
 Parada, Carlos, Genealogical Guide to Greek Mythology, Jonsered, Paul Åströms Förlag, 1993. .

Characters in Greek mythology